Temitope Christopher Tedela  (born 5 June 1990) is a Nigerian actor and producer.
He has received several awards for his work including Africa Magic Viewers Choice Award, Nigeria Entertainment Award, Best of Nollywood Award and Nollywood Movies Award.

Tedela's work has been screened at international film festivals including Cannes Film Festival, Toronto International Film Festival and BFI London Film Festival. His body of work includes Blood Sisters (2022), Country Hard (2021), The Lost Okoroshi (2019), What Lies Within (2017), Slow Country (2017), Ojukokoro (2017), Suru L'ere (2016), A Soldier's Story (2015) and A Mile from Home which earned him several awards.

Early life and education
Temitope Christopher Tedela, the first of four children, was born in Lagos, Nigeria on 5 June 1990. He is of descent from Ekiti State. He attended Lagos State Model College, Meiran, Lagos for his secondary education and earned a degree in Mass Communication from the University of Lagos.

Career
While studying at the University of Lagos, Tedela was cast in his screen debut as Julian in the family TV Series Edge of Paradise. He stopped acting for a while to concentrate on his studies; while in school and shortly after graduation, Tedela worked as an on-air personality at UNILAG FM. He made a return to star as Lala in his first leading role in the feature film A Mile from Home. At one time, Tedela was a news anchor at the NTA. He acted in several notable stage performances.

He came into prominence after playing the lead role in the 2013 award-winning action-drama film, A Mile from Home.

In 2015, Tope Tedela starred in A Soldier's Story and Out of Luck. Tedela's role as metrosexual Kyle Stevens-Adedoyin in the 2016 comedy film Suru L'ere earned him many rave reviews.

Tedela starred in these well-received films in 2017——the epic King Invincible, the comedy-crime/heist film Ojukokoro and the action-drama Slow Country. He made his producing debut with the drama thriller film What Lies Within.

In 2018, Tedela appeared in the crime film, Knock Out Blessing.

In 2019, he starred as researcher Dr Dauda in The Lost Okoroshi which had its world premiere at the 2019 Toronto International Film Festival and received mostly positive reviews. He also began work on his one-man play Whumanizer. Tedela also starred in the gripping drama film, The Ghost and the House of Truth.

In 2020, Tedela was cast in Netflix's first Nigerian original series helmed by award-winning director Akin Omotoso.

In 2022, he portrayed Dr Adeboye/The Good Doctor in the Netflix original series Blood Sisters.

Other work
In 2016, Tedela was named an ambassador by Global Rights, an international human rights organization to start a campaign to end sexual violence in the country.

Awards and nominations

Filmography

Film

Television

Theatre

References

External links

Nigerian male film actors
University of Lagos alumni
Male actors from Lagos
Yoruba male actors
Living people
21st-century Nigerian male actors
Nigerian radio personalities
Yoruba radio personalities
Nigerian male television actors
Nigerian film producers
Actors from Ekiti State
People from Ekiti State
Nigerian film award winners
1990 births